Hertha, Berliner Sport-Club e.V., commonly known as Hertha BSC, Hertha Berlin or simply Hertha, is a German association football club based in the Charlottenburg locality of Berlin. 

This is the list of all Hertha Berlin's European matches.

Overall record
Accurate as of 10 December 2017

Source: UEFA.com

By country

Results

References

External links

Hertha BSC statistics
Hertha BSC formations at football-lineups

Europe
German football clubs in international competitions